Comparative religion is the branch of the study of religions  with the systematic comparison of the doctrines and practices, themes and impacts (including migration) of the world's religions. In general the comparative study of religion yields a deeper understanding of the fundamental philosophical concerns of religion such as ethics, metaphysics and the nature and forms of salvation. It also considers and compares the origins and similarities shared between the various religions of the world. Studying such material facilitates a broadened and more sophisticated understanding of human beliefs and practices regarding the sacred, numinous, spiritual and divine.

In the field of comparative religion, a common geographical classification of the main world religions distinguishes groups such as  Middle Eastern religions (including Iranian religions), Indian religions, East Asian religions, African religions,  American religions,  Oceanic religions, and classical Hellenistic religions.

There also exist various sociological classifications of religious movements.

History 

Al-Biruni and Ibn Hazm of the Islamic Golden Age compared the study of religious pluralism and their works have been significant in the fields of theology and philosophy. Social scientists in the 19th century took a strong interest in comparative and "primitive" religion through the work of Max Müller, Edward Burnett Tylor, William Robertson Smith, James George Frazer, Émile  Durkheim, Max Weber, and Rudolf Otto.
Nicholas de Lange, Professor of Hebrew and Jewish Studies at Cambridge University, says that

Examples that demonstrate this point are Buddhism and Chinese Folk Religions. These belief systems have not historically been seen as mutually exclusive and have blended over time into different beliefs such as Pure Land Buddhism. This shows a marked difference from Western conceptions of religions which see adherence to one religion as precluding membership of another faith.

Hinduism and Buddhism provide another insight in the form of soteriology. Comparative study of religions may approach religions with a base idea of salvation with eternal life after death, but religions like Hinduism or Buddhism don't necessarily share this view. Instead, Hinduism and Theravada Buddhism both speak of a falling back into nonexistence and escaping the cycle of reincarnation, rather than eternal life after death.

Geographical classification 
According to Charles Joseph Adams, in the field of comparative religion, a common geographical classification discerns the main world religions as follows:

 Middle Eastern religions, including Judaism, Christianity, Islam, Zoroastrianism, and a variety of ancient cults;
 East Asian religions, the religious communities of China, Japan, Korea and Vietnam, and consisting of Confucianism, Daoism, the various schools of Mahayana (“Greater Vehicle”) Buddhism, and Shintō; 
 Indian religions, including early Buddhism, Hinduism, Jainism, Sikhism, and sometimes also the Theravada (“Way of the Elders”) Buddhism and the Hindu- and Buddhist-inspired religions of South and Southeast Asia; 
 African religions, the ancient belief systems of the various indigenous peoples of Africa, excluding ancient Egyptian religion, which is considered to belong to the ancient Middle East;
 American religions, the beliefs and practices of the various Indigenous peoples of the two American continents; 
 Oceanic religions, the religious systems of the peoples of the Pacific islands, Australia, and New Zealand; and 
 Classical religions of ancient Greece and Rome and their Hellenistic descendants.

Middle Eastern religions

Abrahamic or Western Asian religions 

In the study of comparative religion, the category of Abrahamic religions consists of the three monotheistic religions, Christianity, Islam and Judaism, which claim Abraham (Hebrew Avraham אַבְרָהָם; Arabic Ibrahim إبراهيم ) as a part of their sacred history. Smaller religions such as Baháʼí Faith that fit this description are sometimes included but are often omitted.

The original belief in the God of Abraham eventually became strictly monotheistic present-day Rabbinic Judaism. Judaism is considered by religious Jews to be the expression of the covenant that God established with the Children of Israel. Jews hold that the Torah is part of the larger text known as the Tanakh or the Hebrew Bible, they also believe in a supplemental oral tradition represented by later texts such as the Midrash and the Talmud. 

Christians believe that Christianity is the fulfillment and continuation of the Jewish Old Testament. Christians believe that Jesus (Hebrew Yeshua יֵשׁוּעַ) is the awaited Messiah (Christ) foretold in the Old Testament prophecies, and believe in subsequent New Testament scripture. Christians in general believe that Jesus is the incarnation or Son of God. Their creeds generally hold in common that the incarnation, ministry, suffering, death on the cross, and resurrection of Jesus was for the salvation of mankind.

Islam believes the present Christian and Jewish scriptures have been corrupted over time and are no longer the original divine revelations as given to the Jewish people and to Moses, Jesus, and other prophets. For Muslims, the Quran is the final, complete revelation from God (Arabic الله Allah), who believe it to have been revealed to Muhammad alone, who is believed by Muslims to be the final prophet of Islam, and the Khatam an-Nabiyyin, meaning the last of the prophets ever sent by Allah ("seal of the prophets").

Based on the Muslim figure of the Mahdī, the ultimate savior of humankind and the final Imām of the Twelve Imams, Ali Muhammad Shirazi, later known as Bab, created the Bábí movement out of the belief that he was the gate to the Twelfth Imām. This signaled a break with Islam and started a new religious system, Bábism. However, in the 1860s a split occurred after which the vast majority of Bábís who considered Mirza Husayn `Ali or Bahá'u'lláh to be Báb's spiritual successor founded the Baháʼí Movement, while the minority who followed Subh-i-Azal came to be called Azalis. The Baháʼí division eventually became a full-fledged religion of its own, the Baháʼí Faith. In comparison to the other Abrahamic religions, Judaism, Christianity and Islam, the number of adherents for Baháʼí faith and other minor Abrahamic religions are not very significant.

Out of the three major Abrahamic faiths, Christianity and Judaism are the two religions that diverge the most in theology and practice.

The historical interaction of Islam and Judaism started in the 7th century CE with the origin and spread of Islam. There are many common aspects between Islam and Judaism, and as Islam developed, it gradually became the major religion closest to Judaism. As opposed to Christianity, which originated from interaction between ancient Greek, Roman, and Hebrew cultures, Judaism is very similar to Islam in its fundamental religious outlook, structure, jurisprudence and practice. There are many traditions within Islam originating from traditions within the Hebrew Bible or from post-biblical Jewish traditions. These practices are known collectively as the Isra'iliyat.

The historical interaction between Christianity and Islam connects fundamental ideas in Christianity with similar ones in Islam. Islam accepts many aspects of Christianity as part of its faithwith some differences in interpretationand rejects other aspects. Islam believes the Quran is the final revelation from God and a completion of all previous revelations, including the Bible.

Mandaeism, sometimes also known as Sabianism (after the mysterious Sabians mentioned in the Quran, a name historically claimed by several religious groups), is a Gnostic and monotheistic religion. John the Baptist is their chief prophet and frequent baptism is part of their core beliefs. According to most scholars, Mandaeism originated sometime in the first three centuries CE, in either southwestern Mesopotamia or the Syro-Palestinian area. However, some scholars take the view that Mandaeism is older and dates from pre-Christian times. Mandaeans assert that their religion predates Judaism, Christianity, and Islam as a monotheistic faith. Mandaeans believe that they descend directly from Shem, Noah's son, and also from John the Baptist's original disciples.

Iranian religions 

Several important religions and religious movements originated in Greater Iran, that is, among speakers of various Iranian languages. They include Zoroastrianism, Mithraism, Ætsæg Din, Yazdanism, Ahl-e Haqq, Zurvanism, Manichaeism, and Mazdakism.

Perhaps one of the most important religions to have come out of Iran was Zoroastrianism. While not, properly speaking, a world religion, it became widespread in the Iranian world, especially through the Achaemenid and Sasanian Empires. It went into decline alongside many Iranian religions with the rise of Islam and the Caliphates. The religion still survives today in small numbers, with a particularly notable example being the Parsis in India.

Scholars have often noted the similarities between Zoroastrianism and the Abrahamic religions, especially Christianity. They've particularly noted this due to the historic relationship between the Jews and the Zoroastrian Persian Empires, as well as the relationship between Greek philosophy, Persia, and Christianity. They've debated whether Zoroastrianism played an influencing role on these religions or not. Particular areas of concern are a shared sense of duality between the forces of good and evil, or light and darkness. In addition to this, there is a shared belief in the resurrection of the dead as well as an emphasis on free will and the moral responsibility of mankind. These are seen by some as having influenced the three major Abrahamic faiths as well as Gnosticism and the Baháʼí Faith.

Manichaeism is another Iranian faith that shares many similarities to Zoroastrianism. In fact, Manichaeism shares a belief in the prophethood of Zoroaster while also maintaining the prophethood of Gautama Buddha and Jesus Christ. It shares a dualist cosmology that pits good and light against evil and darkness, with an adversary to oppose the benevolent God. Manichaeism and Mandaeism also share a common belief in many of the figures and stories of the Abrahamic faiths, which has raised questions of influences and origins.

Indian religions 

In comparative religion, Indian religions are all the religions that originated in South Asia. It is thought that "the kinship of the religions of India stems from the fact that Jains, Buddhists and Sikhs look back to Hinduism as their common mother."

Al-Biruni deeply studied the Vedic religions and through his works essential details about pre-11th century India's religions and cultures were found. Adi Shankaracharya was an early 8th century philosopher and theologian who consolidated the doctrine of Advaita Vedanta. Gautama Buddha is mentioned as an Avatar of Vishnu in the Puranic texts of Hinduism. Most Hindus believe the Buddha accepted and incorporated many tenets of Hinduism in his doctrine. Prominent modern Hindu reformers such as Mahatma Gandhi and Vivekananda acknowledge Buddhist influence. Like Hindus, Gandhi himself did not believe Buddha established a non-Hindu tradition. He writes, "I do not regard Jainism or Buddhism as separate from Hinduism."

East Asian or Taoic religions 

A Taoic religion is a religion, or religious philosophy, that focuses on the East Asian concept of Tao ("The Way"). This forms a large group of eastern religions including Taoism, Confucianism, Jeung San Do, Shintoism, I-Kuan Tao, Chondogyo, and Chen Tao. In large parts of East Asia, Buddhism has taken on some taoic features.

Tao can be roughly stated to be the flow of the universe, or the force behind the natural order. It is believed to be the influence that keeps the universe balanced and ordered and is associated with nature, due to a belief that nature demonstrates the Tao. The flow of Ch'i, as the essential energy of action and existence, is compared to the universal order of Tao. Following the Tao is also associated with a "proper" attitude, morality and lifestyle. This is intimately tied to the complex concept of De, or literally "virtue" or "power." De is the active expression of Tao.

Taoism and Ch'an Buddhism for centuries had a mutual influence on each other in China, Japan, Korea, and Taiwan. These influences were inherited by Zen Buddhism when Ch'an Buddhism arrived in Japan and adapted as Zen Buddhism.

Despite being too far from each other to have had any influence, some have historically noted similarities between traditional Chinese religious beliefs and Christianity. This was noted by Jesuit missionaries who became known as figurists. Figurists promoted the idea that the ancient Chinese knew the truth of Christian revelation and that many of the figures described in Chinese texts are actually figures and concepts from Christianity. Noted parallels include shared flood myths, similarities between Fu Xi and Enoch, as well as parallels between Christ and the sages. There is also a noted similarity between the Tao being "the Way" as well as Christ claiming to be "the Way."

While scholarship rejects this view today, it was a notable view in the history of comparative religion. These beliefs were ultimately opposed and disavowed by the Catholic Church in the 18th century.

The introduction of Nestorian Christianity to China under the Tang dynasty also led to increasing similarities between Chinese Buddhism and Nestorian Christianity. Christians began using Buddhist and Taoist concepts to explain their faith. During this time the Jingjiao documents were created, sometimes called sutras, that demonstrated the blending of Christianity with Buddhism. The two also formed a monastic tradition that furthered the similarities. This fusion became so heavy that when Emperor Wuzong of the Tang dynasty began persecuting Buddhists in the 9th century, he claimed that Christianity was merely a heresy of Buddhism rather than its own religion. This equation of the two led to the collapse of Nestorian Christianity in China alongside the persecution of Buddhism.

Comparing traditions

Baháʼí Faith 
 Baháʼí Faith and the unity of religion
 Baháʼí Faith and Buddhism
 Baháʼí Faith and Hinduism
 Baháʼí Faith and Zoroastrianism

Buddhism 
 Buddhism and Christianity
 Buddhism and Eastern religions
 Buddhism and Gnosticism
 Buddhism and Hinduism
 Buddhism and Jainism
 Buddhism and Theosophy
 Buddhism and Islam
 Comparison of Buddhism and Christianity

Christianity 
 Christianity and other religions
 Buddhism and Christianity
 Comparison of Buddhism and Christianity
 Christianity and Islam
 Christianity and Judaism
Christianity and Neopaganism
 Christianity and Paganism
 Christianity and Vodou
Christianity and Mormonism
Christianity and Theosophy

Mormonism
 Mormonism and Christianity
 Mormonism and Islam
 Mormonism and Judaism

Confucianism 
 Confucianism and eastern religions
 Confucianism and western religions

Hinduism 
 Hinduism and other religions
 Baháʼí Faith and Hinduism
 Buddhism and Hinduism
 Hindu–Islamic relations
 Jainism and Hinduism
 Hinduism and Sikhism
 Hinduism and Judaism

Islam 
 Islam and other religions
 Christianity and Islam
 Hindu–Islamic relations
 Islam and Jainism
 Islamic–Jewish relations
 Islam and Sikhism
 Mormonism and Islam

Jainism 
 Buddhism and Jainism
 Islam and Jainism
 Jainism and Sikhism

Judaism 
 Christianity and Judaism
 Islamic–Jewish relations
 Hinduism and Judaism

Paganism and Neopaganism 
 Christianity and Paganism
Christianity and Neopaganism

Sikhism 
 Hinduism and Sikhism
 Islam and Sikhism
 Jainism and Sikhism

Taoism 
 Taoism and other religions

Zoroastrianism 
 Zoroastrianism and other religions
Zoroastrianism and Baháʼí Faith

See also 

 Comparative mythology
 Comparative theology
 Hierographology
 Inclusivism
 Institute for Interreligious Dialogue
 Interfaith
 List of founders of religious traditions
 List of religions
 Panbabylonism
 Parallelomania and parallelophobia
 Parliament of the World's Religions
 Patternism
 Religious pluralism
 Religious universalism
 Integral theory (Ken Wilber)

Notes

References

Works cited

Further reading 
 Chopra, R. M. A Study of Religions, (Anuradha Prakashan, New Delhi, 2015) .
 Davis, G. Scott. Believing and Acting: The Pragmatic Turn in Comparative Religion and Ethics (Oxford University Press, 2012).
 Eastman, Roger. The Ways of Religion: An Introduction to the Major Traditions. (3rd ed. Oxford University Press, 1959) .
 Eliade, Mircea. Patterns in comparative religion (1958) online
 Eliade, Mircea. The Sacred and the Profane: The Nature of Religion (1959) online

 Gothoni, Rene, How to Do Comparative Religion: Three Ways, Many Goals (2005) online
 James, E. O. Comparative Religion (1961) online textbook
 Jones, Lindsay, ed. Encyclopedia of Religion (2nd edn, 15 vols, Macmillan, 2004)

  
 Muhiyaddin, M. A. (1984) A Comparative Study of the Religions of Today. Vantage Press, US. .
 Paden, William E. "Comparative religion." in The Routledge companion to the study of religion (Routledge, 2009).  pp 239-256. online
 Paden, William E. New patterns for comparative religion: Passages to an evolutionary perspective (Bloomsbury, 2016).
 Paden, William E. Interpreting the Sacred: Ways of Viewing Religion (2003) excerpt
 Paden, William E. Religious Worlds: The Comparative Study of Religion (2015) excerpt
 Saso, Michael R. Mystic, Shaman, Oracle, Priest (MYSHOP): Prayers Without Words. (Sino-Asian Institute of America, US, 2015) . . 
 Sharpe, Eric J.  Comparative Religion: A History, London: Duckworth, 1975 (2nd revised edition 1986).
 Shaw, Jeffrey M. Illusions of Freedom: Thomas Merton and Jacques Ellul on Technology and the Human Condition. (Wipf and Stock, 2014). .
 Smart, Ninian. Dimensions of the Sacred: An Anatomy of the World's Beliefs  (1999) 
 Smith, Huston. The World's Religions: Our Great Wisdom Traditions. (1991)  HarperOne, US; Rev Rep edition. .

External links 
 Patheos.com's Side-By-Side Comparative "Lenses"
 ReligiousTolerance.org 
 ReligionFacts.com
 Comparative-religion.com
 Studies in Comparative Religion
 Answers to Questions of Faith From Several Worldviews
 comparative religion studies inspired by Aldous Huxley's The Perennial Philosophy
Have religious discussions and debates both voice and text on telegram group: Discuss Religion